Turie is a village and municipality in Žilina District in the Žilina Region of northern Slovakia.

History
In historical records the village was first mentioned in 1386.

Geography
The municipality lies at an altitude of 446 metres and covers an area of 27.204 km². It has a population of about 1970 people.

External links
 http://www.statistics.sk/mosmis/eng/run.html

Villages and municipalities in Žilina District